Karun Kuh is a mountain locate in the area of Shimshal Valley, a valley in the Karakoram range of Asia. Located in the area of Shimshal, Gilgit–Baltistan, Pakistan, it has a summit elevation of 6,977 m above sea level.

See also
 List of mountains in Pakistan
 List of Ultras of the Western Himalayas

References

Mountains of Gilgit-Baltistan
Six-thousanders of the Karakoram